Open collaboration is any "system of innovation or production that relies on goal-oriented yet loosely coordinated participants who interact to create a product (or service) of economic value, which is made available to contributors and noncontributors alike." It is prominently observed in open source software, but can also be found in many other instances, such as in Internet forums, mailing lists and online communities. Open collaboration is also thought to be the operating principle underlining a gamut of diverse ventures, example including bitcoin, TEDx, and Wikipedia.

Definition 
Juliet Schor noted that "a clear definition of technology-mediated open collaboration might be difficult to pin down".

Riehle et al. define open collaboration as collaboration based on three principles of egalitarianism, meritocracy, and self-organization. Levine and Piretula define open collaboration as "any system of innovation or production that relies on goal-oriented yet loosely coordinated participants who interact to create a product (or service) of economic value, which they make available to contributors and noncontributors alike." This definition captures multiple instances, all joined by similar principles. For example, all of the elements — goods of economic value, open access to contribute and consume, interaction and exchange, purposeful yet loosely coordinated work — are present in an open source software project, in Wikipedia, or in a user forum or community. They can also be present in a commercial website that is based on user-generated content. In all of these instances of open collaboration, anyone can contribute and anyone can freely partake in the fruits of sharing, which are produced by interacting participants who are loosely coordinated.

History 
Open collaboration is the principle underlying peer production, and mass collaboration. It was observed initially in open source software, and has been popularized by Richard Stallman's GNU Manifesto. Since then it can also be found in many other instances, such as in Internet forums, mailing lists, Internet communities, and many instances of open content, such as creative commons. It also explains some instances of crowdsourcing, collaborative consumption, and open innovation.

Academia 
An annual conference dedicated to the research and practice of open collaboration is the International Symposium on Open Collaboration (OpenSym, formerly WikiSym). As per its website, the group defines open collaboration as "collaboration that is egalitarian (everyone can join, no principled or artificial barriers to participation exist), meritocratic (decisions and status are merit-based rather than imposed) and self-organizing (processes adapt to people rather than people adapt to pre-defined processes)."

See also
 Commons-based peer production
 Money-free market
 Open-source model
 Resource-based economy

References

Collaboration
Crowdsourcing
Computer programming
Information technology
Free software
Computational economics
Public commons